China Grove is a town in Rowan County, North Carolina, United States. The population was 4,434 at the 2020 census.  The town is located just north of Landis and south of Salisbury. It was one of the first towns in the United States to have Rural Free Mail Delivery.

The town was named for a grove of chinaberry trees planted near the depot.

Geography
China Grove is located at  (35.570289, -80.577934).

Demographics

2020 census

As of the 2020 United States census, there were 4,434 people, 1,696 households, and 927 families residing in the town.

2000 census
At the 2000 census there were 3,616 people in 1,388 households, including 999 families, in the city. The racial makeup of the town was 85.70% White, 6.97% African American, 0.28% Native American, 0.94% Asian, 0.14% Pacific Islander, 5.39% from other races, and 0.58% from two or more races. Hispanic or Latino of any race were 9.43%.

Of the 1,388 households 34.1% had children under the age of 18 living with them, 53.7% were married couples living together, 13.2% had a female householder with no husband present, and 28.0% were non-families. 24.9% of households were one person and 11.5% were one person aged 65 or older. The average household size was 2.58 and the average family size was 3.05.

The age distribution was 25.6% under the age of 18, 9.9% from 18 to 24, 29.9% from 25 to 44, 21.0% from 45 to 64, and 13.6% 65 or older. The median age was 35 years. For every 100 females there were 94.1 males. For every 100 females age 18 and over, there were 92.7 males.

The median household income was $36,580 and the median family income  was $40,402. Males had a median income of $29,167 versus $21,932 for females. The per capita income for the town was $17,040. About 10.2% of families and 12.8% of the population were below the poverty line, including 18.2% of those under age 18 and 7.5% of those age 65 or over.

Education
Most students in the town are served by the Rowan-Salisbury School System and primarily go to South Rowan High School, located in the town.

Notable people
Gary Chapman, best-selling author of The Five Love Languages
Jackie Fargo (a.k.a. Henry Faggart), former professional wrestler resided in China Grove. Fargo once led the careers of Jerry Lawler and The Fabulous Ones Stan Lane and Steve Keirn.
Jack "Sonny Fargo" Faggart, professional wrestler.
 Jack Melchor, venture capitalist
Curly Seckler, mandolin player with the Foggy Mountain Boys
 Dillon Stevens, actor and dancer best known for playing Michael in touring productions of Billy Elliot the Musical
 Wednesday 13, rock musician
 Carey Hoyt Bostian, former Chancellor of North Carolina State University

See also
 China Grove Township

References

External links
 
 Police department

Towns in Rowan County, North Carolina